Royal Swedish Opera is an opera and ballet company based in Stockholm, Sweden.

Location and environment
The building is located in the center of Sweden's capital Stockholm in the borough of Norrmalm, on the eastern side of Gustav Adolfs torg across from the former Arvfurstens Palats, now Ministry for Foreign Affairs. It lies on the north side of the Norrström river and is connected to the Royal Palace through the Norrbro bridge.

Further historically as well as architecturally important buildings in the close neighborhood are the Sager House, official residence of the Prime Minister of Sweden, and the Riksdag building.

History
The opera company was founded with the Royal Swedish Academy of Music by King Gustav III and its first performance, Thetis and Phelée with Carl Stenborg and Elisabeth Olin, was given on 18 January 1773; this was the first native speaking opera performed in Sweden.

But the first opera house was not opened until 1782 and served for a century before being replaced at the end of the 19th century. Both houses are officially called the "Royal Opera", however the terms "The Gustavian Opera" and "The Oscarian Opera", or the "Old" and "New" Opera are used when distinction is needed.

The Gustavian Opera 
The original Stockholm Opera House, the work of architect Carl Fredrik Adelcrantz was commissioned by King Gustav III, a strong adherent of the ideal of an enlightened absolutism and as such was a great patron of the arts. The Swedish Opera company had first been located in Bollhuset, but there was a need to separate the Opera from the theatre and give them separate buildings. Construction began in 1775 and the theatre was inaugurated on 30 September 1782 with a performance of the German composer Johann Gottlieb Naumann's Cora och Alonzo. 
It was also the place for public masquerade balls, events inspired from the famous opera-balls in Paris, which was open for everyone wearing a mask at a cheap cost and somewhat ill-reputed. 

The building was very imposing with its centre Corinthian tetrastyle portico supporting four statues and topped by the royal crown. The four-tiered auditorium was oval in shape, had excellent acoustics and sight lines. The sumptuous foyer contained neoclassic medallions and pilasters.

It was in the foyer of the opera house where the king met his fate: during a masquerade on 16 March 1792, he was shot by Jacob Johan Anckarström, and died 13 days later. (In turn, this event inspired the operas Gustave III by Daniel Auber and  Un ballo in maschera by Verdi.) Following the assassination, the opera house was closed until 1 November 1792, when it was opened again, which by some was considered shocking. The son of Gustav III, King Gustav IV Adolf of Sweden, did not like the Opera, possibly because of the murder of his father, and disliked the fact that the scene of his father's murder was used as a place of amusement and leisure, and when a frivolous play was performed for his queen Frederica of Baden in 1806, he decided to close it down. It remained closed until 1809, and when the king was deposed, it took until May 1812, before it was organised enough to be fully opened again.

The Oscarian Opera, Operan 

The old opera was demolished in 1892 to give way to the construction of a new Opera drawn by Axel Johan Anderberg, which was finished seven years later and inaugurated by King Oscar II with a production of a Swedish opera (that tradition having been quite firmly established during the 19th century), Franz Berwald's Estrella de Soria.

The new house had the letters Kungl. Teatern, literally "Royal Theatre" (which caused the later-founded Royal Dramatic Theatre to add the distinction "dramatic" to its name).  The building is now simply called Operan ("The Opera"), written in golden letters above the middle arch on the front facade. It is a majestic neo-classical building with a magnificent gold foyer (Guldfoajén) and elegant marble grand staircase leading to a three-tiered auditorium somewhat smaller than the old theatre. It presently seats 1,200. Most productions are now sung in the original language (with Swedish subtitles), with only a few in Swedish.

The Royal Swedish Family of King Carl XVI Gustaf keeps the Royal Box reserved, located in the first tier in the auditorium above the orchestra pit.

Ensembles, artists and artistic leadership 
Famous singers who have been part of the opera's ensemble have included Jussi Björling, Gösta Winbergh, Nicolai Gedda, Peter Mattei, Jenny Lind, Birgit Nilsson, Elisabeth Söderström, Fritz Arlberg, Anne Sofie von Otter, Katarina Dalayman and Nina Stemme.

The orchestra of the Royal Swedish Opera, the Royal Swedish Orchestra, Kungliga Hovkapellet, dates back to 1526. Royal housekeeping accounts from 1526 mention twelve musicians including wind players and a timpanist but no string players. Consequently, the Royal Swedish Orchestra is one of the oldest orchestras in Europe.

Armas Järnefelt was on the music staff from 1905, rising to become chief conductor between 1923–1933 and 1938–1946. The Royal Swedish Ballet, Kungliga Baletten, was founded by Gustav III of Sweden in 1773.

The current general manager of the Royal Swedish Opera is the Swedish mezzo-soprano Birgitta Svendén.  She is currently contracted in the post through 2022.  In November 2020, the company announced the appointment of Michael Cavanagh as its next artistic director, effective in the summer of 2021, with an initial contract of 5 years.  The company's most recent chief conductor was Lawrence Renes, who held the post from 2012 through 2017.  In January 2020, Royal Swedish Opera announced the appointment of Alan Gilbert as its next music director, effective in the spring of 2021.  Gilbert had first guest-conducted with the company in 2012.

References
Notes
  
Sources
Beauvert, Thierry, Opera Houses of the World, The Vendome Press, New York, 1995. 
Zeitz, Karyl Lynn, Opera: the Guide to Western Europe's Great Houses, Santa Fe, New Mexico: John Muir Publications, 1991. 
 Georg Nordensvan, "Svensk teater och svenska skådespelare". (Swedish)

External links

Buildings and structures in Stockholm
Opera houses in Sweden
Music in Stockholm
1773 establishments in Sweden
Swedish opera companies
Tourist attractions in Stockholm
Royal Swedish Ballet
Theatres completed in 1782
Music venues completed in 1782
Theatres completed in 1899
Music venues completed in 1899
Art Nouveau architecture in Stockholm
Art Nouveau theatres